Pleasant Hill is an unincorporated community in Independence County, Arkansas, United States.

References

Unincorporated communities in Independence County, Arkansas
Unincorporated communities in Arkansas